Yang Luyu (born March 1957) is a former Chinese politician, who served as Mayor of Jinan, Shandong Province. He was dismissed from his position in April 2016 for investigation by the Central Commission for Discipline Inspection.

Career
Yang Luyu was born in Ju County, Shandong. He joined the CPC in July 1985 and graduated from the department of Construction of Harbin Institute of Technology. In 1987, Yang became the Ministry of Construction official. In November 1992,  he became the deputy mayor of Dongying. He moved to Ministry of Construction in 1999. In 2003, he served as deputy mayor of Jinan Yang became the Communist Party Secretary of Tai'an in 2008. In January 2012, Yang elected as mayor of Jinan.

On April 6, 2016, Yang Luyu was placed under investigation by the Central Commission for Discipline Inspection, the party's internal disciplinary body, for "serious violations of regulations". He was expelled from the Communist Party on July 28 for violating the Eight-point Regulation and taking bribes in exchange for political favours. On May 5, 2017, Yang was sentenced to 14 years in prison for bribery.

References

1957 births
Chinese Communist Party politicians from Shandong
People's Republic of China politicians from Shandong
Political office-holders in Shandong
Politicians from Rizhao
Harbin Institute of Technology alumni
Living people
Chinese politicians convicted of corruption
Expelled members of the Chinese Communist Party